Sangouiné is a town in western Ivory Coast. It is a sub-prefecture and commune of Man Department in Tonkpi Region, Montagnes District.

In 2014, the population of the sub-prefecture of Sangouiné was 36,832.

Villages
The twenty four villages of the sub-prefecture of Sangouiné and their population in 2014 are:

Notes

Sub-prefectures of Tonkpi
Communes of Tonkpi